Calinda muiscas is a species of jumping plant lice of the genus Calinda in the family of Triozidae. The species was first described in 1997 by Olivares and Burckhardt.


Etymology and habitat 
Although the species name is linked to the Muisca who inhabited the central highlands of Colombia, the holotype has been found near former Inca Emperor estate Ollantaytambo, Cusco, Peru.

Description 
An adult male specimen of Calinda muiscas has been described having a brownish-ochre head and thorax. The antennae are dark-brown and ochreous, legs, abdomen and genitalia are ochreous. The forewing is yellowish-transparent with ochreous veins. The louse as apical dilatation of aedeagus, elongate with distinct ventro-basal hook distant from shaft. The forewing is about 2 mm long. The host plant for the jumping plant louse is unknown.

References

Bibliography 
 

Triozidae
Insects described in 1997
Fauna of Peru
Insects of South America